Margaret Elizabeth Reid  (née McLachlan; born 28 May 1935) is a former Australian politician who served as a Senator for the Australian Capital Territory from 1981 to 2003, representing the Liberal Party. She is the first woman to have served as President of the Senate, holding that office from 1996 to 2002.

Early years
Born Margaret McLachlan at Crystal Brook near Adelaide, South Australia, Reid was educated at the University of Adelaide, obtaining a LLB. There she joined the Liberal Party, becoming the first female president of the Australian Liberal Students Federation. After graduating, Reid became a barrister, specialising in family law; and moved to Canberra in 1965.

Political career
On 5 May 1981, Reid was elected by a joint sitting of the Australian Parliament to fill a casual vacancy in the representation of the Australian Capital Territory in the Senate, following the sudden death of her close friend, Senator John Knight.  This was the first of only two occasions on which a Senate casual vacancy was filled in this manner, as the law was later changed to provide for a replacement senator to be appointed by the relevant territory (ACT or NT) legislative assembly.

Reid became Liberal Whip in the Senate in 1987 and held the office until 1995. In 1996, she was elected President of the Senate, retiring from the position in 2002 after six years. Reid resigned from the Senate on 14 February 2003, and was replaced by the former ACT Chief Minister, Gary Humphries.

Honours and awards
In 2004 Reid was appointed Officer of the Order of Australia for her service to the Australian Parliament and the community.

Personal life
Reid married in 1966 Tom Reid MBE, a widower with four children, who was Director of Honeysuckle Creek Tracking Station during its involvement in the Apollo program. She adopted his children; they had no further children.

Reid is an active patron of over 80 community organisations in Canberra. She is the patron of the Australian Women's History Forum with Mary Sexton. She was inaugural President of the Australian Centre for Christianity and Culture.

External links
Former Presidents of the Australian Senate

References

1935 births
Living people
Liberal Party of Australia members of the Parliament of Australia
Members of the Australian Senate
Members of the Australian Senate for the Australian Capital Territory
Presidents of the Australian Senate
Adelaide Law School alumni
Women members of the Australian Senate
Officers of the Order of Australia
21st-century Australian politicians
21st-century Australian women politicians
20th-century Australian politicians
20th-century Australian women politicians